Artem Smolyakov (born 29 May 2003) is a Ukrainian professional footballer who plays as a defender for Inhulets Petrove in the Ukrainian Premier League.

Career

Early years
Smolyakov is a product of the Dnipro youth sportive school system.

Inhulets Petrove
He signed a contract with the Ukrainian Premier League side Inhulets Petrove in August 2020. He made his debut in the Ukrainian Premier League for Inhulets against Shakhtar Donetsk on 22 November 2021.

References

External links 

2003 births
Living people
Ukrainian footballers
Association football defenders
FC Inhulets Petrove players
Ukrainian Premier League players